The Coupe de la Martinique is the top knockout tournament of Martinique football. It was created in 1953.

Winners
1953 : Golden Star
1954 : Club Franciscain
1955 : Club Colonial
1956 : Good Luck
1957 : Golden Star
1958 : Golden Star
1959 : Club Colonial
1960 : US Robert
1961 : US Robert
1962 : Club Colonial
1963 : Golden Star
1964 : Aussaut de St Pierre
1965 : Aussaut de St Pierre
1966 : Aussaut de St Pierre
1967 : Aussaut de St Pierre
1968 : Aussaut de St Pierre
1969 : Club Franciscain
1970 : Golden Star
1971–72 : not known
1973 : Good Luck
1974 : Good Luck
1975–76 : not known
1977 : CS Case-Pilote
1978 : RC Rivière-Pilote
1979 : Good Luck
1980 : Club Colonial
1981 : RC Rivière-Pilote 2–1 US Robert
1982: Club Peléen
1983: La Gauloise de Trinité
1984: US Robert
1985: Réal Tartane
1986 : Club Franciscain
1987 : Club Franciscain
1988–89 : not known
1990 : Club Franciscain
1991: La Gauloise de Trinité
1992–94 : not known
1995 : Aiglon du Lamentin
1996 : Aiglon du Lamentin
1997 : not known
1998 : Club Franciscain 4-3 (aet) Aiglon du Lamentin
1999 : not known
2000 : Aussaut de St Pierre 2–2 (aet, 4–2 pen) Club Franciscain
2001 : Club Franciscain 2–1 Réveil Sportif de Gros-Morne
2002 : Club Franciscain 1–0 RC Rivière-Pilote
2003 : Club Franciscain 1–0 New Club
2004 : Club Franciscain 2–2 (aet, 13–12 pen) US Robert
2005 : Club Franciscain 5–1 Club Colonial
2006 : CS Case-Pilote 1–0 Gri-Gri Pilotin
2006–07 : Club Franciscain  4–1 Samaritaine
2007–08 : Club Franciscain  2–1 Golden Star
2008–09 : Aiglon du Lamentin 2–0 Club Franciscain
2009–10 : CS Case-Pilote 2–1 Rapid Club
2010–11 : RC Rivière-Pilote 2–2 (aet, 5–4 pen) Golden Lion
2011–12 : Club Franciscain 2–1 Essor-Préchotain
2012–13 : RC Rivière-Pilote 2–1 Club Franciscain
2013–14 : Club Colonial 1–0 Golden Lion
2014–15 : Club Franciscain 2–2 (aet, 3–2 pen) Club Colonial
2015–16 : Golden Lion 0–0 (aet, 4–3 pen) Club Franciscain
2016–17 : Samaritaine 2–1 Good Luck
2017–18 : Club Franciscain 2–1 RC Rivière-Pilote
2018–19 : Golden Lion 4–0 Essor-Préchotain
2019–21 : Club Franciscain 1–0 Aiglon du Lamentin
2021–22 : CO Trénelle 5–1 US Robert
2022–23: Club Franciscain 2–0 Golden Lion

References

Football competitions in Martinique
Martinique
Mart